The Floyd Shale is a geologic formation in Georgia. It preserves fossils dating back to the Carboniferous period.

See also

 List of fossiliferous stratigraphic units in Georgia (U.S. state)
 Paleontology in Georgia (U.S. state)

References
 

Geologic formations of Georgia (U.S. state)
Shale formations of the United States
Oil fields in Texas
Oil-bearing shales in the United States
Natural gas fields in the United States
Carboniferous Georgia (U.S. state)
Mississippian United States
Carboniferous System of North America
Carboniferous southern paleotropical deposits